McGirt is a surname. Notable people with the surname include:

Buddy McGirt (born 1964), boxing trainer and retired boxer
Dan McGirt, American author, of the comic fantasy genre
Eddie McGirt (1920–1970), American football coach
William McGirt (born 1979), American professional golfer
"McGirt" may also refer to the United States Supreme Court case McGirt v. Oklahoma (2020).
de:McGirt